Gemma Usieto (born 8 January 1965) is a Spanish sports shooter. She competed at the 1988 Summer Olympics, the 1992 Summer Olympics and the 1996 Summer Olympics.

References

1965 births
Living people
Spanish female sport shooters
Olympic shooters of Spain
Shooters at the 1988 Summer Olympics
Shooters at the 1992 Summer Olympics
Shooters at the 1996 Summer Olympics
People from Huesca
Sportspeople from the Province of Huesca
20th-century Spanish women
21st-century Spanish women